Topeka is a 1953 American Western film directed by Thomas Carr and starring Wild Bill Elliott,  Phyllis Coates and Rick Vallin.

Plot

Cast
 Wild Bill Elliott as Jim Levering 
 Phyllis Coates as Marian Harrison  
 Rick Vallin as Ray Hammond  
 Fuzzy Knight as Pop Harrison  
 John James as Marv Ronsom  
 Denver Pyle as Jonas Bailey  
 Dick Crockett as Will Peters  
 Harry Lauter as Mack Wilson  
 Dale Van Sickel as Henchman Jake Manning  
 Ted Mapes as Henchman Cully  
 Henry Rowland as Cheated Gambler  
 Edward Clark  as Banker Corley  
 I. Stanford Jolley as Doc Mason

References

Bibliography
 Martin, Len D. The Allied Artists Checklist: The Feature Films and Short Subjects of Allied Artists Pictures Corporation, 1947-1978. McFarland & Company, 1993.

External links
 

1953 films
1953 Western (genre) films
American Western (genre) films
Films directed by Thomas Carr
Allied Artists films
Films set in Kansas
Films scored by Raoul Kraushaar
American black-and-white films
1950s English-language films
1950s American films